Simon-Pierre Saint-Hillien C.S.C. (July 6, 1951 – July 22, 2015) was a Roman Catholic bishop.

Ordained to the priesthood in 1980, Saint-Hillien was appointed auxiliary bishop in 2002 and then bishop of the Roman Catholic Diocese of Hinche, Haiti, in 2009.

Notes

1951 births
2015 deaths
Congregation of Holy Cross bishops
21st-century Roman Catholic bishops in Haiti
Roman Catholic bishops of Hinche
Roman Catholic bishops of Port-au-Prince